Alsophila is a genus of the moth family Geometridae, subfamily Alsophilinae. The genus was erected by Jacob Hübner in 1825. The genus is notable because of distinct sexual dimorphism leading to strongly reduced wings in females, so much so that they cannot fly. The moths fly in late autumn or early spring.

Species
 Alsophila aceraria ([Denis & Schiffermüller], 1775)
 Alsophila acroama Inoue, [1944]
 Alsophila aescularia ([Denis & Schiffermüller], 1775) – March moth 
 Alsophila bulawski Beljaev, 1996
 Alsophila foedata Inoue, 1944
 Alsophila inouei Nakajima, 1989
 Alsophila japonensis Warren, 1894
 Alsophila kurentzovi (Viidalepp, 1986)
 Alsophila murinaria Beljaev, 1996
 Alsophila pometaria Harris, 1841 – fall cankerworm 
 Alsophila vladimiri Viidalepp, 1986
 Alsophila yanagitai Nakajima, 1995
 Alsophila zabolne Inoue, 1941

References

Alsophilinae
Geometridae genera